Spencer Road Halt railway station was a halt on the Woodside and South Croydon Railway opened in 1906 and closed on 15 March 1915.

History 

The site is hidden in an alleyway between Spencer Road and Birdhurst Rise in South Croydon. The railway had hoped that passengers would change to the Brighton Line by making the ten-minute walk to South Croydon station but very few did. Spencer Road was among several new stations and halts opened in the suburbs, including Reedham and Bandon, to compete with the convenience of electric trams and to a lesser extent omnibuses, whose effect was being felt on railway income particularly with regard to shorter journeys.

Apart from a metal footbridge which carried the path between Spencer Road and Birdhurst Rise over the line, the halt consisted of just a pair of wooden platforms and nameboards. Oil lamps were also likely to have been provided. The platforms were reached from wooden gates on either side of the footbridge; a notice adjoining the gate was headed "Woodside and South Croydon Railway" and warned passengers against taking a short-cut over the railway line and use the footbridge.

The halt closed in 1915 as a wartime economy, but remained intact until at least 1931. The remains were cleared by the Southern Railway in preparation for reopening and electrification of the line in 1935. An up starter signal for Selsdon on a post made of old rails was subsequently installed on the site of the Up platform, and during the Second World War a tank trap was built on the site of the Down platform.

Present day 
The halt has been demolished but the footbridge remains in use.  the double track was still in place but heavily overgrown. The nearby overbridge crossing Croham Road is also extant.

References

External links
 
 Article at Subterranea Britannica with several  images
 Photo of the adjacent scout hut, on the Up side, from the footbridge
 Woodside & South Croydon railway

Disused railway stations in the London Borough of Croydon
Railway stations in Great Britain opened in 1906
Railway stations in Great Britain closed in 1915
Former buildings and structures in the London Borough of Croydon
Former Woodside and South Croydon Joint Railway stations